Richard George may refer to:

Richard George (athlete) (born 1953), American javelin thrower
Rick George, athletic director of Colorado Buffaloes
Richard George (MP) (1562–1613) for Cirencester
Richard George (manufacturer) (1944–2016), British food manufacturer
Richard Lloyd George, 2nd Earl Lloyd-George of Dwyfor (1889–1968), British soldier and peer

See also
Richard St George (disambiguation)